Stevimir Ercegovac (born 20 January 1974 in Zagreb, Socialist Republic of Croatia, Yugoslavia) is a former Croatian shot putter, who represented his native country at the 2000 Summer Olympics in Sydney, Australia. His personal best is 20.28 metres, thrown in 2000 in Rijeka.

Ercegovac attended Taylor University from 1998-2002 and was NAIA National Shot Put Champion in each of those years. He also holds the NAIA shot put outdoor record at 20.06m.

Competition record

References

 Indiana Invaders Add Olympian Stevimir Ercegovac

External links

1974 births
Living people
Croatian male shot putters
Athletes (track and field) at the 2000 Summer Olympics
Olympic athletes of Croatia
Sportspeople from Zagreb
Universiade medalists in athletics (track and field)
Mediterranean Games bronze medalists for Croatia
Mediterranean Games medalists in athletics
Athletes (track and field) at the 1997 Mediterranean Games
Universiade bronze medalists for Croatia
Medalists at the 1999 Summer Universiade